Ronald Edmund Dupree, Jr. (born January 26, 1981) is an American former professional basketball player who played six seasons in the National Basketball Association (NBA). He also played numerous seasons in the NBA Development League, and spent time in Europe and Argentina. After developing Ben Simmons at LSU as the director of student development, and serving as an assistant coach at the University of Nevada Reno, Dupree was hired to be a scout for the Milwaukee Bucks.

College career
Dupree played at Louisiana State University (LSU) under Coach John Brady. He averaged 4.9 points and 3.3 rebounds in 12.7 minutes per game in the Tigers' 2000 Sweet Sixteen season. He was named All-SEC Second Team in his sophomore, junior, and senior seasons. During his sophomore season he led the SEC in scoring at 17.3 points per game and was second in rebounding with 8.8 per game.  In each of his last three years he ranked second in the SEC in rebounding with averages of 8.8 (2000–2001), 8.5 (2001–2002), and 8.3 (2002–2003). He also never finished lower than seventh in the league in scoring in his final three seasons.  He finished his LSU career as the school's eighth-most-prolific scorer and sixth-best rebounder.

Professional career
Dupree went undrafted in 2003, but signed during the 2003–04 season with the Chicago Bulls. After his rookie season, he signed a contract with the Detroit Pistons, but was infrequently used by coach Larry Brown. Dupree was traded to the Minnesota Timberwolves prior to the 2005–06 season for a second-round draft pick. He re-signed with the Pistons on July 17, 2006.  On December 14, 2007, he was waived so the Pistons could make room for other players obtained in a trade with the Charlotte Bobcats. He was signed to a ten-day contract by the Seattle SuperSonics on April 3, 2008, becoming the last player to sign with the Sonics.

Dupree started the 2008–2009 season with the Tulsa 66ers of the NBA Developmental League. Halfway through the season he was traded to the Utah Flash, and helped take that team to the D-League finals. Dupree was invited to training camp with the Utah Jazz for preparation to the 2009–2010 season. However, he did not make their final roster.

He signed a non-guaranteed contract with the Toronto Raptors on September 16, 2010. Dupree was released from the Toronto Raptors roster on October 19, 2010. He was re-signed by Toronto on December 26, 2010, but waived again on January 5, 2011.

He signed with the Argentine team Regatas Corrientes in January 2012. He then signed with the Italian team Andrea Costa Imola Basket in February 2012. In September 2012, he joined the Memphis Grizzlies, but he did not make the team's regular season roster.

On January 4, 2013, Dupree was acquired by the Los Angeles D-Fenders. On February 25, 2013, Dupree was traded to the Reno Bighorns. On August 8, 2013, he signed a two-year deal with Hapoel Jerusalem.

On September 10, 2014, he announced his retirement and became a student assistant on the LSU men's basketball staff.

NBA career statistics

Regular season 

|-
| align="left" | 2003–04
| align="left" | Chicago
| 47 || 8 || 19.0 || .394 || .444 || .629 || 3.6 || 1.2 || .7 || .4 || 6.2
|-
| align="left" | 2004–05
| align="left" | Detroit
| 47 || 0 || 10.0 || .480 || .500 || .617 || 2.0 || .5 || .1 || .2 || 3.2
|-
| align="left" | 2005–06
| align="left" | Minnesota
| 36 || 0 || 7.4 || .524 || .000 || .341 || 1.4 || .4 || .3 || .0 || 2.2
|-
| align="left" | 2006–07
| align="left" | Detroit
| 19 || 0 || 4.9 || .355 || .000 || .333 || .9 || .3 || .3 || .1 || 1.3
|-
| align="left" | 2007–08
| align="left" | Detroit
| 1 || 0 || 3.0 || .000 || .000 || .000 || .0 || .0 || .0 || .0 || .0
|-
| align="left" | 2007–08
| align="left" | Seattle
| 4 || 0 || 4.5 || .333 || .000 || 1.000 || 2.0 || .3 || .3 || .0 || 1.0
|-
| align="left" | 2010–11
| align="left" | Toronto
| 3 || 0 || 4.3 || .250 || .000 || .000 || 1.0 || .3 || .0 || .0 || 0.7
|- class="sortbottom"
| style="text-align:center;" colspan="2"| Career
| 157 || 8 || 11.2 || .427 || .385 || .559 || 2.2 || .6 || .4 || .2 || 3.5

Playoffs 

|-
| align="left" | 2005
| align="left" | Detroit
| 14 || 0 || 2.7 || .286 || .000 || .000 || .4 || .0 || .0 || .0 || .3
|- class="sortbottom"
| style="text-align:center;" colspan="2"| Career
| 14 || 0 || 2.7 || .286 || .000 || .000 || .4 || .0 || .0 || .0 || .3

References

External links

LSU Tigers bio

1981 births
Living people
African-American basketball players
American expatriate basketball people in Argentina
American expatriate basketball people in Canada
American expatriate basketball people in Germany
American expatriate basketball people in Israel
American expatriate basketball people in Italy
American men's basketball players
Andrea Costa Imola players
Basketball players from Mississippi
Biloxi High School alumni
Chicago Bulls players
Detroit Pistons players
Hapoel Jerusalem B.C. players
Huntsville Flight players
Los Angeles D-Fenders players
LSU Tigers basketball players
Minnesota Timberwolves players
Reno Bighorns players
Regatas Corrientes basketball players
Seattle SuperSonics players
Small forwards
Sportspeople from Biloxi, Mississippi
Telekom Baskets Bonn players
Toronto Raptors players
Tulsa 66ers players
Undrafted National Basketball Association players
Utah Flash players
21st-century African-American sportspeople
20th-century African-American people